Ruud Gerard Nijman (born 15 June 1982) is a Dutch cricket player.

Cricket career
Nijman was included but did not appear in the Netherlands national cricket team for the 2003 Cricket World Cup but did not play a match.

Nijman made his one-day international debut for the Netherlands against Kenya in Potchefstroom in 2009.

In February 2010 he made his first-class cricket debut in a match between the Netherlands and Kenya in Nairobi.

References

1982 births
Living people
Dutch cricketers
Netherlands One Day International cricketers
Sportspeople from Groningen (city)
Sportspeople from Schiedam